Bantva-Manavadar or Manavadar State was a princely state during the era of the British Raj in India. It was located on the Kathiawar peninsula in Gujarat.

See also
Political integration of India
Bantva Memons
Bantva

References

External links

 This article incorporates text from a publication now in the public domain: 

Princely states of India
Pashtun dynasties
Muslim princely states of India
History of Gujarat
1733 establishments in India
1947 disestablishments in India
States and territories disestablished in 1947